Webster Davis (June 1, 1861 – February 22, 1923) was a mayor of Kansas City, Missouri from 1894 to 1896 and was the Assistant Secretary of the Interior from 1897 to 1898.

Early life
Davis was born on June 1, 1861, in Ebensburg, Pennsylvania. In 1868 his family moved to a farm in Chillicothe, Missouri and then to Gallatin, Missouri where his father began a shoemaking operation. He worked on the farm, clerked in a store and worked in his shoemaking business.

In 1881 Davis moved to Lake Forest, Illinois, where he was a lamplighter. He then returned to Gallatin, and resumed shoemaking and clerking. In 1882 Davis became a copyist in the law office of Shanklin, Low & McDougal and studied law while he worked there. In 1884 he attended the University of Kansas and became a lawyer initially practicing in Garden City, Kansas.

Career
Davis became active in the Republican Party. After graduating from the University of Michigan Law School he moved to Kansas City, Missouri where he unsuccessfully ran for Congress in 1892.

Davis was elected as mayor of Kansas City in 1894. In 1897, Davis was appointed by President William McKinley as Assistant Secretary of the Interior.

He was forced to resign after an 1898 visit to South Africa when he sympathized with the Boers.  Unable to get a plank supporting them in the Republican Party platform, he switched to being a Democrat. He wrote a book about the Boer War entitled John Bull's Crime: Or, Assaults on Republics which was published in 1901.

He died in Kansas City on February 22, 1923, and is buried in Elmwood Cemetery.

References

External links

 

1861 births
1923 deaths
People from Ebensburg, Pennsylvania
Missouri Republicans
Missouri Democrats
People from Chillicothe, Missouri
People from Gallatin, Missouri
Politicians from Chicago
University of Kansas alumni
University of Michigan Law School alumni
Kansas lawyers
Mayors of Kansas City, Missouri
Kansas Republicans
People from Garden City, Kansas
19th-century American lawyers